Vaani Kapoor (born 23 August 1988) is an Indian actress who known for her work in Hindi films. She made her acting debut with the romantic comedy film Shuddh Desi Romance, which became critical and commercial success, and earned her Filmfare Award for Best Female Debut. 

After facing criticism for her performances in the Tamil film Aaha Kalyanam (2014) and Befikre (2016), Kapoor took a three-year hiatus. She has since played brief roles of the love interest in action films, such as War (2019), and gained praise for starring as a transgender woman in the romantic comedy Chandigarh Kare Aashiqui (2021).

Early life and education 
Kapoor was born in Delhi, India, into a Punjabi Hindu family. Kapoor's father Shiv Kapoor is a furniture exports entrepreneur and her mother Dimpy Kapoor is a teacher-turned marketing executive. She did her schooling from Mata Jai Kaur Public School in Ashok Vihar, North West Delhi. Later she enrolled in Indira Gandhi National Open University at Maidan Garhi, completing a bachelor's degree in tourism studies, after which she took up an internship with Oberoi Hotels & Resorts in Jaipur, Rajasthan and later worked for ITC Hotel. She was signed by the Elite Model Management for modeling projects.

Career 

Kapoor started her career in the Hindi film industry by signing a three films deal with Yash Raj Films. She was selected through an audition to play a supporting role in the romantic comedy Shuddh Desi Romance, alongside Sushant Singh Rajput and Parineeti Chopra. The film dealt with the subject of live-in relationships; it received positive feedback from critics, and Kapoor's portrayal of an outspoken girl, Tara, was praised. Mohar Basu of Koimoi wrote that Kapoor was "a pleasant debutant though she isn’t an overtly powerful actress" while Madhureeta Mukherjee of The Times Of India thought that she was "impressive, pretty and commands a good screen-presence". Shuddh Desi Romance collected ₹76 crore (US$9.8 million) at the box-office worldwide and emerged as a commercial success.  At the 59th Filmfare Awards, Kapoor was awarded with the Best Female Debut award.

Kapoor's next release was the Tamil romantic comedy Aaha Kalyanam, an official remake of the 2010 Hindi film Band Baaja Baaraat. She was cast opposite Nani and learned the Tamil language for the film. Upon release, the film was panned by critics and her performance was poorly received. In 2016, Kapoor appeared in Aditya Chopra's romantic comedy Befikre opposite Ranveer Singh, which was set in Paris. She played Shyra Gill, a French tourist guide of Indian descent whose romantic liaisons with Singh's character leads to conflict between them. The received negative reviews from critics and was considered to be a box-office failure.

After a three-year break from films, she appeared in the action thriller War, alongside Hrithik Roshan and Tiger Shroff. It was by Siddharth Anand and once again produced by Yash Raj Films. War set the record for the highest-opening day collection for a Bollywood film in India of over 53.35 crores nett domestically  and went on to become the highest-grossing Indian film of 2019, earning over 475 crores Worldwide and 318 crores net domestically in India thus entering the 300 Crore Club.  thereby being her most successful film so far. However, she was criticised for her limited screen space, and her presence was widely considered as mainly to add a glamour quotient.

Kapoor next starred in the 2021 action thriller Bell Bottom alongside Akshay Kumar, which marked her first film not to be produced by Yash Raj Films. Similar to War, she played the brief role of the male lead's love interest. Hindustan Times noted, "Kapoor is charming as Akshay's onscreen wife, and for a change, she isn't there just as a trophy wife but complements his character well." In the same year, Kapoor starred in the romantic drama Chandigarh Kare Aashiqui opposite Ayushmann Khurrana. She was praised for her portrayal of a transgender woman in the film. Writing forTimes of India, Hiren Kotwani opined that "Kapoor sinks her teeth into her character from the word go and gives a no-holds-barred performance" while also praising her chemistry with Khurrana.

Kapoor next starred in Shamshera (2022), a period drama starring Ranbir Kapoor. It received negative reviews and she yet again had limited screen time. DNA India wrote, "As the female lead, while Vaani Kapoor’s Sona may not have a great character arc, she’s absolutely owned every frame with ease and confidence."

Filmography

Films

All films are in Hindi unless otherwise noted.

Music videos

Awards and nominations

References

External links 
 

1988 births
Living people
Punjabi people
21st-century Indian actresses
Actresses in Hindi cinema
Actresses in Tamil cinema
Indian film actresses
Actresses from Delhi
Filmfare Awards winners
Zee Cine Awards winners
International Indian Film Academy Awards winners
Indian women
Punjabi Hindus